Withe is a surname. Notable people with the surname include:

Chris Withe (born 1962), English footballer
Jason Withe (born 1971), English footballer and manager
Peter Withe (born 1951), English footballer and manager